Thermoniphas distincta is a butterfly in the family Lycaenidae. It is found in Uganda, Rwanda, Burundi, western Tanzania, the Democratic Republic of the Congo (Lualaba and Shaba) and northern Zambia. The habitat consists of stream banks.

References

Butterflies described in 1935
Thermoniphas